The 2023 Democratic Party leadership election was a primary election that was held in Italy in February 2023 to elect the National Assembly and secretary of the Democratic Party (PD). It consisted of a closed primary election among party members held from 9 to 19 February, and an open primary election held on 26 February.

Four candidates ran in the closed primary election held in circle conventions: Stefano Bonaccini, Gianni Cuperlo, Paola De Micheli, and Elly Schlein. Bonaccini and Schlein advanced to the open primary election, where Schlein won with over 53% of the vote, becoming the first woman and the youngest person to ever serve as leader of the PD, as well as the first openly LGBT leader of a major Italian political party. The results of the election defied the predictions of a vast majority of polling firms, which had anticipated a Bonaccini victory. It was the PD's first party leadership election in which the winner of the members' vote lost in the open primary.

Electoral process
The process consists of two phases: a first round, in which only  members of the PD can vote, and a second round, a runoff between the two candidates who got the most votes in the first round, in which every citizen who identifies with the party's ideals can vote. The PD is the only major Italian party that allows non-members to elect the secretary by open primary.

The term of office of the secretary is usually four years, along with the National Assembly; when the former resign in advance, the National Assembly can choose whether to elect another secretary, who would serve until the natural expiration of the mandate is reached, or to dissolve the National Assembly itself earlier and call a new leadership election.

After the outgoing secretary tenders their resignation, the party president must gather the members of the National Assembly within a month. On the same day, the National Assembly would elect the members of the National Committee for the Congress, which would act in place of the elected bodies until the end of the leadership election, whose main job is drafting the rules of the details procedure under which the leadership election is to take place. The National Committee also handles internal disputes and appeals relating to the leadership election.

The National Committee elects its president and sets the rules and the dates, and lay them before the National Board. The election must take place within four months following the secretary's resignation.

Timetable

Candidates

Candidates who progressed to the final round
On 20 February 2023, the following individuals were the two top contenders in the closed vote in party circles, thus entering the primary open to voters.

Before vote by party members
On 20 February 2023, the following individuals didn't manage to get enough votes in party circles to enter the primary open to voters.

Declined to be candidates 
The following individuals have been the subject of speculation about their possible candidacy, but have publicly denied interest in running.
Enrico Letta, Member of the Chamber of Deputies (2021–present, 2001–2015), Secretary of the Democratic Party (2021–present), Prime Minister of Italy (2013–2014), Deputy secretary of the Democratic Party (2009–2013), Secretary of the Council of Ministers (2006–2008), Member of the European Parliament (2004–2006), Minister for the Community Policies (1998–1999), Deputy secretary of the Italian People's Party (1997–1998), Minister of Industry, Commerce and Crafts (1996–1998)

Endorsements

Candidates who progressed to the final round

Stefano Bonaccini

Elly Schlein

Before vote by party members

Gianni Cuperlo

Paola De Micheli

Electoral debates

Opinion polls

Advanced candidates

Before vote by party members

Hypothetical polls

Results

Vote by party members

Primary election

Results by regions

References

2023 elections in Italy
Democratic Party (Italy)
Political party leadership elections in Italy
2023 political party leadership elections
February 2023 events in Italy